Zoe Gardner (born 1975, London, England) is a comedy writer/actress in television, radio and theatre.

Gardner studied at Cambridge University and is half of the comedy team The Congress of Oddities.  They have recorded a TV pilot based on their live Congress shows for Celador Productions.

Credits
Recent television includes; Mongrels (BBC Three) 2010, Ideal (BBC Two) 2009, Katy Brand's Big Ass Show, (ITV2) 2008/09, Cowards (BBC Four) 2008, Comedy Shuffle (BBC Three) 2007, 28 Acts in 28 Minutes (BBC Three) 2007, The Slammer (CBBC) 2006, Meet The Blogs (Mersey Television), 2006
Comedy Cuts (Granada for ITV2) 2007.

Gardner also wrote and performed her own solo show entitled Zoe Gardner's Fault at the 2008 Edinburgh Festival Fringe.

Theatre credits include  Coffee, a play by Glyn Cannon and Colin Hoult's Carnival of Monsters, both at the 2009 Edinburgh Festival Fringe.

In 2010 Zoe performed in Hoult's second solo show Enemy of the World and her own show An Hour of Telly Live alongside Margaret Cabourn-Smith both at the Edinburgh Festival.

Zoe returned to the Edinburgh Festival in 2011 performing in a play, Light's, Camera, Walkies by Tom Glover and Colin Hoult's third Edinburgh solo outing entitled Inferno.

References

External links

 Official Website

1975 births
Living people
British actresses